Salah Uddin Kamran is a Bangladesh Nationalist Party politician and the former Member of Parliament of Noakhali-3.

Career
Kamran was elected to parliament from Noakhali-3 as a Bangladesh Nationalist Party candidate in 1991.

References

Bangladesh Nationalist Party politicians
Living people
5th Jatiya Sangsad members
Year of birth missing (living people)